A bacchanale is an orgiastic musical composition, often depicting a drunken revel or bacchanal.

Examples include the bacchanales in Camille Saint-Saëns's Samson and Delilah, the Venusberg scene in Richard Wagner's Tannhäuser, "Danse générale (Bacchanale)" from Maurice Ravel's "Daphnis et Chloé," and Tableau 4, the Bacchanale in Alexander Glazunov's The Seasons.  John Cage wrote a Bacchanale in 1940, his first work for prepared piano. The French composer Jacques Ibert was commissioned by the BBC for the tenth anniversary of the Third Programme in 1956, for which he wrote a Bacchanale. 

In 1939, Salvador Dalí designed the set and wrote the libretto for a ballet entitled Bacchanale, based on Wagner's Tannhäuser and the myth of Leda and the Swan.

Bacchanale (1954) was written by composer Toshiro Mayuzumi, for 5 saxophones (soprano, 2 alto, tenor, baritone), timpani, percussion (4), piano, celesta, harp, and strings. The previous year, he had written a Bacchanale for orchestra.

"Bacchanale" (1975) is also a track composed by the Greek musician, Vangelis, on his Heaven and Hell (Vangelis album) album.

References

Works cited
 
 
 
 
 
 
Classical music styles